Natalie Ogg is an American fashion model.

Early life and career 
Ogg is a biology student at the University of California, San Diego after transferring from New York University.

Ogg debuted as a semi-exclusive for Alexander Wang in the F/W 2018 season. That season she also walked for Salvatore Ferragamo, Versace, Calvin Klein, Prada, Burberry, Fendi, Valentino, Alexander McQueen, Chanel, Dries Van Noten, Off-White, Loewe, Sonia Rykiel, Hermès, and Stella McCartney.

Ogg was deemed a "Top Newcomer" of 2018, by models.com.

References 

Living people
Models from San Diego
Female models from California
Year of birth missing (living people)
The Society Management models
Elite Model Management models
21st-century American women